Richard Harrington may refer to:

Richard Harrington (photographer) (1911–2005), German-Canadian photographer
Richard Harrington (actor) (born 1975), Welsh actor
Richard Harrington, Baron Harrington of Watford (born 1957), MP for Watford from 2010 to 2019.
Richard C. Harrington (1956–2004), British physician and psychologist